Eskişehirspor Kulübü is a Turkish professional football club located in Eskişehir. Eskisehirspor has a total of six trophies, making them the sixth most trophies holders in Turkey. Founded in 1965, Eskişehirspor competed in the top division of Turkish football for 16 years until they were relegated. After being out of the Süper Lig for 12 years the club won the TFF First League playoffs and were promoted in May 2008. Since being relegated from the Süper Lig in 2016 they have competed in lower leagues.

History

Early years 

Eskişehirspor was founded by merging the regional teams of İdman Yurdu, Akademi Gençlik and Yıldıztepe and was admitted to the Second League in the 1965–1966 season. The team was promoted to the First League in its first professional season. Eskişehirspor became one of the better historically rich Anatolian clubs despite having never won the Süper Lig between 1968 and 1975. They were runners-up in 1968–1969, 1969–1970, and 1971–1972 seasons. Eskişehirspor won the Turkish Cup in the 1969–1970 season by beating Bursaspor by 4–3 (1–2, 3–1) aggregate and a year after that in 1970–1971 season they lifted the Cumhurbaskanligi Kupasi (President Cup) by beating Galatasaray once again by the same scoreline 3–2 with all goals coming from the Eskişehirspor legend himself Fethi Heper.

Unforgettable match 
One of Eskişehirspor's greatest matches took place in the 1970–71 UEFA Cup against Sevilla FC. Eskişehirspor lost the away leg 1–0, but Fethi Heper won it for them 3–2, scoring a hat-trick in front of a home crowd with only 10 minutes left to play.

1980s and 1990s 
After that, they started to slowly lose their success. Eskişehirspor relegated to Second League in 1981–82 season after an eventful match against Beşiktaş at Round 34, which was also last round. The match was halted at 78th minute due to intemperance of Eskişehirspor's supporters, when after Beşiktaş's midfielder Ziya's goal at 76th minute, and match score was changed to 2–1 for Beşiktaş. Eskişehirspor was announced 3–0 unanimously lost by TFF and relegated as 1 point behind of Gaziantepspor. Also, Beşiktaş finished their championship yearning since 1967. Eskişehirspor returned 1st League in 1983–84 season. They reached Federation Cup final in 1986–87 season but lost against Gençlerbirliği by 6–2 aggregate. They won Chancellor Cup against Beşiktaş after penalty shoots as 4–2, total 6–4. This match was resulted 2–2.

They relegated again Second League after 1–0 lost against Galatasaray, which goal scored by Tanju at Round 38, which was also last round in 1988–89 season. Eskişehirspor collected 41 points and remained behind of Altay by average. They relegated to Third League once after finishing third from last at Group A of 2nd League in 1991–92 season. However, they returned to Second League next season after finishing 1st at Group 5 of Third League.

Eskişehirspor finished 1st at 3rd Group in Second League and qualified for Promotion Group in 1994–95 season. They finished 3rd and qualified to Extra Playoff. They defeated successively Erzurumspor as 2–1, Adanaspor as 3–2, which after extra time and Aydınspor as 2–1 and returned to First League. Eskişehirspor's new adventure at First League lasted only one season and relegated after 7-1 losing against Trabzonspor despite a good start against İstanbulspor and this match finished 3–1 for Eskişehirspor. Eskişehirspor qualified to Promotion Playoff but didn't return to First League in 1997–98. They escaped from relegation to Third League danger and Petrolofisi relegated in 1998–99 season. Eskişehirspor finally qualified to Second League Category B (later Second League), who is third level of Turkish League, after 2000–2001 season.

Back to the Süper Lig 
Eskişehirspor finished 1st in 3rd Group of Iddaa League B and played in Promotion Group in 2005–2006 season. They finished 3rd behind of Kasımpaşa and Gençlerbirliği Asaşspor and qualified for Extra Playoff matches. Eskişehirspor's first play off match was against Kardemir Karabükspor. After regular and extra time the match ended in a 0–0 draw. Eskişehirspor advanced to quarter final game after beating them 3–1 in the penalty shoot out. They also defeated Sarıyer after 6–5 in the penalty shoot out. Regular and extra time the match ended in a 0–0 draw before penalty shoot out. They defeated 3–0 Kartalspor in semifinal and Pendikspor in final and promoted to First League. Eskişehirspor finished 13th in 2006–2007 season. After a successful season in the Bank Asya First League, Eskişehirspor finished in 4th place and qualified for the playoffs in 2007–2008 season. The playoffs determine who is going to take the third and final promotion spot for the Süper Lig.

Eskişehirspor's first play off match was against Diyarbakirspor. The match ended 0–0 after regular and extra time, Eskişehirspor won the penalty shoot out, 6–5.

The final match against Boluspor was held at the Beşiktaş' Inonu Stadium in Istanbul. At the end of 90 minutes Eskişehirspor were promoted to the Süper Lig winning 2–0, with goals from Doğa Kaya and Coşkun Birdal.

On 3 June 2008, Halil Ünal was elected as the new chairman of Eskişehirspor. Rıza Çalımbay was appointed as manager for the 2008–2009 season. Eskişehirspor beat Galatasaray twice (4–2 at home and 1–0 at away), and draw 2–2 with Fenerbahçe at home in this season and secured Süper Lig status for 2009–2010 season, despite losing 5–2 at home to Trabzonspor on 24 May 2009. The 2009–2010 season was a much more progressive period for ESES. Almost all title chasing clubs were beaten in the Eskisehir Stadium by Kirmizi Simsekler. ESES had a very poor beginning to the 2010–2011 season, losing 6 matches back to back. Rıza Çalımbay was sacked by the board and Bulent Uygun was announced as the new Coach. Within a short time he and his technical staff solved the main problems of the team, and, after 10 matches, almost qualified for the UEFA Cup, but were ranked 7th in the table at end of the season. During the summer break, Bulent Uygun was fired and Michael Skibbe announced as new coach.

Crest and colours
The unmistakable emblem was actually designed by Eskisehirspor's first club chairman Aziz Bolel and perfected by graphic designer Selahattin Vapur, the three stars represent the merger of Akademi Gençlik, İdmanyurdu and Yıldıztepe.

The club colours were inspired by French club Stade Rennais' 1964–1965 Coupe De France win, the board saw Rennes lifting the cup celebrating on the front page of a football magazine and immediately fell in love with the club colours and adopted them as their own believing that it would bring them good luck.

Stadium

Eskişehir Atatürk Stadium
Eskişehir Atatürk Stadium is a multi-purpose stadium in Eskişehir, Turkey. It was used mostly as Eskişehirspor's home ground. The stadium was built in 1953 and holds 13,520 people. It was named after the Turkish statesman Mustafa Kemal Atatürk.

New Eskişehir Stadium
New Eskişehir Stadium will be a multi-use stadium in the Sazova Park district of (West) Eskişehir, Turkey. The all-seated stadium will be totally covered and have a capacity of nearly 32,500 people.
It was also one of the 9 candidate host stadiums of the Turkish bid for EURO 2016. Despite losing the election, the Chairman of TFF said "we have to work on these stadiums like a winner of the election; I'm going to talk about it with the Prime Minister".

The New Eskişehir Stadium will be the centrepiece for the development of a new sports, business and university park, planned by the City of Eskişehir on the northern periphery of the town. Eskişehir is famous for Sepiolite (Meerschaum) mining which has left a distinct signature on the landscape and inspired the façade of the stadium. The inner walls will be constructed partially with serigraphic glass to provide maximum transparency from the inside and to emphasise its open character at night. A newly planned tram will connect the New Eskişehir Stadium with the city centre, the airport and the university. This new public transport will accelerate the development of the new sports, leisure and business area. A new express ring road around the city will also pass just south of the stadium providing excellent access.

On 7 January 2010, the Eskişehirspor president, Halil Ünal, Eskişehir mayor, Prof. Dr. Yılmaz Büyükerşen and Eskişehir governor, Mehmet Kılıçlar, signed the agreement to construct the new stadium in Muttalip.

The stadium will also replace the Eskişehir Atatürk Stadium, current home ground of Eskişehirspor.

Supporters
The supporters create a great atmosphere during the season with their Band Team (known as BandoESES). Besides BandoESES, there is another supporter group (known as KoreoESES), who create very different and unique shows, with some beautiful choreographies for every match, at the stadium and on the road. Eskisehirspor supporters are really different than others when it comes to supporting their club through 2nd and even 3rd divisions. They regard their old fashioned stadium as holy grounds and reject the idea that it be moved to the outskirts of the city for the modern one. Because of their passionate, obsessive and dominant atmosphere during matches, they are the envy of many other team's supporters. They have gained recognition and respect as one of the fiercest fanbases in Turkey and are known as a "phenomenon" of Turkish football.

Bando ESES
Founded in 2006 in the 'Samba Bar', Eskişehir, what started as a group of friends has grown into one of the most well known and respect supporter groups in Turkey. Bando-ESES currently has 23 active musicians playing instruments ranging from Trumpets to traditions Turkish davul drums. They are accompanied by loyal backing members who also help out. The group bring a change to the usual chanting and really liven games up turning matches into a carnival atmosphere. They can help to control the tempo of the game and have a range of musical styles. The group are well organised and are constantly growing.

Controversy 
On 14 May 2016, after losing 1–2 to İstanbul BB, by a late winning goal in the 93rd minute, Eskişehirspor, after all the effort to stay, were relegated from the Süper Lig. Fans of the club, the Eskişehirspor Ultras, upset with this, set fire to their own stadium. The stadium was never used again.

Honours 
Süper Lig
Runners-up (3): 1968–69, 1969–70, 1971–72
Turkish Cup
Winners (1): 1970–71
Runners-up (3): 1969–70, 1986–87, 2013–14
Turkish Super Cup 
Winners (1): 1970–71
Prime Minister's Cup:
Winners (3): 1966, 1972, 1987
Balkans Cup:
Runners-up (1): 1975

League participations 
 Süper Lig: 1966–82, 1984–89, 1995–96, 2008–2016
 TFF First League: 1965–66, 1982–84, 1989–92, 1993–95, 1996–01, 2006–08, 2016–2021
 TFF Second League: 1992–93, 2001–06, 2021–

Competition history

European record

UEFA club ranking

Players

Current squad

Other players under contract

Managers 

 Abdullah Matay (1965–66)
 Cihat Arman (1966–67)
 Abdulah Gegić (1 July 1967 – 30 June 1971)
 Abdullah Matay (1971–72)
 Tomislav Kaloperović (1973)
 Abdullah Matay (1973–74)
 Octavian Popescu (1974–75)
 Abdullah Matay (1976)
 Abdulah Gegić (1977–78)
 Abdullah Matay (1981–82)
 Milorad Mitrović (1981–83)
 Abdulah Gegić (1983)
 Milorad Mitrović (1985–86)
 Ender Konca (1986)
 Đorđe Gerum (1986–87)
 Abdullah Matay (1986–87)
 Milorad Mitrović (1988–89)
 Ender Konca (1990)
 Ilie Datcu (1991)
 Abdullah Matay (1993–94)
 Yılmaz Vural (23 May 1995 – 14 Dec 1995)
 Güvenç Kurtar (1996)
 Akif Başaran (20 Nov 1998 – 30 June 1999)
 Buran Beadini (1999), (1999–00), (2001)
 Yavuz İncedal (2006–07)
 Metin Diyadin (4 April 2007 – 30 June 2008)
 Nenad Bijedić (21 March 2008 – 1 June 2008)
 Rıza Çalımbay (4 July 2008 – 30 June 2011)
 Bülent Uygun (6 Oct 2010 – 7 July 2011)
 Michael Skibbe (18 July 2011 – 21 Dec 2011)
 Ersun Yanal (26 Dec 2011 – 25 June 2013)
 Ertuğrul Sağlam (28 June 2013 – 5 Jan 2015)
 Michael Skibbe (8 Jan 2015 – 10 Oct 2015)
 Ismail Kartal (11 Oct 2015 – 12 Nov 2015)
 Samet Aybaba (17 Nov 2015 – 19 May 2016)
 Alpay Özalan (23 Jun 2016 – 14 Mar 2017) 
 Mustafa Denizli (23 Feb 2017 – 30 Jun 2017) 
 Sergen Yalçın (31 Jul 2017 – 25 Sep 2017) 
 Yücel İldiz (25 Sep 2017 – 5 Apr 2018) 
 Yılmaz Vural (6 Apr 2018 – 30 Jun 2018) 
 Fuat Çapa (7 Aug 2018 – 12 Sep 2019)
 Coşkun Demirbakan (18 Sep 2019 – 25 Dec 2019)
 Mustafa Özer (26 Dec 2019 – 28 Sep 2020)
 İlhan Var (9 Oct 2020 – 5 Jan 2021)
 Yasin Söğüt (21 Jan 2021 – 3 Feb 2021)
 Cengiz Seçsev (3 Feb 2021– 14 Apr 2021)
 Cem Karaca (29 Jul 2021 – 19 Oct 2021)
 Suat Kaya (20 Oct 2021 – 30 Jul 2022)
 Emre Özbayer (4 Jul 2022 –   )

See also 
Eskişehirspor (women)
Eskişehirspor Magazine

References

External links 
Official website
Eskişehirspor on Turkish Football Federation.org

 
Association football clubs established in 1965
Sport in Eskişehir
Football clubs in Turkey
1965 establishments in Turkey
Süper Lig clubs